West Virginia Route 152 is a north–south state highway extending from Crum to Huntington, West Virginia. The northern terminus of WV 152 is unusual in that it also serves as the southern terminus of West Virginia Route 527, which continues along the same street as it passes over Interstate 64 at exit 8 (both state routes are indicated on exit signage on the expressway). WV 527 continues along the former routing of U.S. Route 52 through downtown Huntington, West Virginia on its way toward Chesapeake, Ohio. The southern terminus of the route is at US 52 northeast of Crum.

Portions of the roadway south of Wayne run along an old Norfolk and Western Railroad bed. There is an abandoned depot at Dunlow. Under some of the highway bridges, you can find shared abutments with the old railroad crossing.

History
WV 152 was formerly part of U.S. Route 52. The current designation was created in 1979, when US 52 was rerouted a few miles to the west in order to facilitate the construction of a more modern highway along the Tug Fork and Big Sandy River. The West Virginia Department of Transportation redesignated the former segment of US 52 as WV 152 from its internal designation as route 1/52, as it formerly ran between County Route 1 and US 52.

Major intersections

References

152
Transportation in Cabell County, West Virginia
Transportation in Wayne County, West Virginia
U.S. Route 52